El Oso (Spanish for The Bear) is the third and final studio album by the New York City band Soul Coughing, released on September 29, 1998 by Slash Records and Warner Bros. Records. The album received generally positive critical reception upon release.

El Oso made it to #1 on KTUH's charts on the week of January 25, 1999.

Background
The album's style takes heavy inspiration from the electronic music style drum and bass, which followed after the band toured with supporting DJs Krust and Die prior to the album's conceptualization; drum and bass DJ and producer Optical was enlisted to co-produce the album. Artist Jim Woodring (Frank) drew the cartoon "monkey-bear" on the disc's cover. The chorus of the song "$300" is a sample of a Chris Rock joke; singer Mike Doughty heard the joke which is backmasked on Rock's live standup album Roll with the New. Curious, Doughty recorded it into his ASR-10 sampler with the intention of simply reversing it and seeing what the joke was, and wrote the song around what he found there.

In popular culture
The album contains their biggest hit single, "Circles". Cartoon Network notably aired a music video in which a Flintstones cartoon was synched to the song as part of their Groovies interstitial. The music video features Fred, Barney and other Hanna-Barbera characters walking in front of the same repeating background, with subtitles showing existential dialogue. The video for the song "Rolling" was also produced, which was synced with a scene from a Betty Boop cartoon. The song was used in the 2004 remake of Walking Tall. "$300" was used in the House episode "The Softer Side" in 2009.

Track listing
All music by Soul Coughing. All lyrics written by Mike Doughty unless otherwise noted.
"Rolling" – 3:36
"Misinformed" – 3:25
"Circles" – 3:07
"Blame" – 5:01
"St. Louise Is Listening" – 4:29
"Maybe I'll Come Down" – 4:32
"Houston" – 4:04
"$300" – 3:08
"Fully Retractable" – 3:26
"Monster Man" – 4:16
"Pensacola" (Doughty/Ava Chin) – 4:16
"I Miss the Girl" – 4:03
"So Far I Have Not Found the Science" – 2:53
"The Incumbent" (Doughty/Mark De Gil Antoni) – 6:46
"212" (Japanese release bonus track)
"Rare Star Ball" (Japanese release bonus track)

Personnel

Soul Coughing
Mike Doughty (billed as "M. Doughty") – vocals, guitar, songwriting, keyboards, programming
Sebastian Steinberg – bass, upright bass, backing vocals, keyboards, programming
Mark de Gli Antoni – keyboards, turntables, programming, Pro Tools editing, songwriting (14)
Yuval Gabay – drums, keyboards, programming

Other personnel
 Tchad Blake - producer, mixing, keyboards, programming
 Pat Dillett - producer, mixing, keyboards, programming, overdubs (2)
 Optical - producer, mixing, keyboards, programming (1, 4)
 Ryoji Hata (2, 9, 13, 14), Husky Huskolds (1 to 3, 5 to 7, 8, 10 to 13) - assistant engineering
 Ava Chin - songwriting (10)
 Jim Woodring - cover illustrations
 John Cutcliffe - management 
 Bob Ludwig - mastering
 Snorri Bros. - photography 
 STAIN - art Direction, design

References

External links
 
 The Making of El Oso (Written by Mike Doughty, December 1997)

1998 albums
Albums produced by Tchad Blake
Soul Coughing albums
Slash Records albums
Albums produced by Pat Dillett
Albums produced by Optical (musician)